Chishma-Karan (Şişmä-Qaran) is a rural locality (a village) in Chekmagushevsky District, Bashkortostan, Russia. The population was 28 as of 2010. There is 1 street.

Geography 
Chishma-Karan is located 31 km southwest of Chekmagush (the district's administrative centre) by road. Rozhdestvenka is the nearest rural locality.

References 

Rural localities in Chekmagushevsky District